Tack Lake is a 16-acre lake in Cook County, Minnesota which is tributary to the Poplar River through Rice Lake. Water clarity surveys performed by the University of Minnesota indicated Tack Lake had a visibility of 2.48 meters in 2008.

References

Lakes of Cook County, Minnesota
Lakes of Minnesota
Superior National Forest